Anil Kumar Bhattacharyya (1 April 1915 – 17 July 1996) was an Indian statistician who worked at the Indian Statistical Institute in the 1930s and early 40s. He made fundamental contributions to multivariate statistics, particularly for his measure of similarity between two multinomial distributions, known as the Bhattacharyya coefficient, based on which he defined a metric, the Bhattacharyya distance.  This measure is widely used in comparing statistical samples in biology, physics, computer science, etc.

Distance between statistical distributions had been addressed in 1936 by Mahalanobis, who proposed the D2 metric, now known as Mahalanobis distance. Subsequently, Bhattacharyya defined a cosine metric for distance between distributions, in a Calcutta Mathematical Society paper in 1943, expanding on some of the results in another paper in Sankhya in 1946. Bhattacharyya's two major research concerns were the measurement of divergence between two probability distributions and the setting of lower bounds to the variance of an unbiased estimator.

Life
Bhattacharyya was born to Bhavanath and Lilavati, sometime in March–April 1915 (in the month Chaitra Bengali: চৈত্র of the year 1321, the exact date is not known) at Bhatpara in the district of 24 Parganas of West Bengal. He passed the Matriculation Examination of Calcutta University in 1932 and I. Sc. Examination in 1934 from Hooghly Mohshin College. In 1936 he ranked first in the First Class at the B.A./B.Sc. examination from the same college and went over to the renowned Science College, Calcutta University for an M.Sc. in Mathematics. Here he had F. W. Levi and Raj Chandra Bose as his teachers and passed the M.A. Examination in 1938 with the first rank in the First Class.

In 1939, at Levy's suggestion, Bhattacharyya met P. C. Mahalanobis and joined Indian Statistical Institute as an honorary worker. In 1941, he was made a part-time lecturer in the newly formed Statistics Department of Calcutta University, headed by Mahalanobis. Here he had C. R. Rao, H. K. Nandi and T. P. Choudhury, as his students. He went to Patna to take up the job of Statistical Officer of Bihar Government, in December 1943 and, in 1946, he returned to Calcutta to join Indian Statistical Institute as Superintending Statistician (in charge of training). Mahalanobis requested him to concurrently take classes in the Statistics Department of Presidency College. After the post was created, Bhattacharyya was made a whole-time Senior Professor and Head of the Department in 1949. He occupied the post of Senior Professor until his retirement in March 1974, but in 1967 he stepped down from the leadership, apparently piqued by certain moves of the West Bengal Government's Education Department.  Almost since his retirement from Government service, he had been associated with the Narendrapur Ramakrishna Mission Residential College as a guest teacher, where a Memorial Scholarship is awarded in his name.

Works
"A note on Ramamurti's problem of maximal sets", Sankhya, 6 (1942) 189 - 192. 

"On a measure of divergence between two statistical populations defined by their probability distributions", Bull. Cal. Math. Soc, 35 (1943) 99 - 109. 

"On some sets of sufficient conditions leading to the normal bivariate distribution", Sankhya, 6 (1943) 399 - 406. 

"A note on the distribution of the sum of chi-squares", Sankhya, 7 (1945), 27 - 28. In this paper, an expression of the distribution function of sum two dependent Chi-square random variables was given in the form of a convergent series in Laguerre polynomials.

"On some analogues of the amount of information and their uses in statistical estimation" I, Sankhya, 8 (1946) 1 - 14. 

"On some analogues of the amount of information and their uses in statistical estimation" II, Sankhya, 8 (1947) 201 - 218. 

"On some analogues of the amount of information and their uses in statistical estimation" III, Sankhya, 8 (1948) 315 - 328. 

"On a measure of divergence between two multinomial populations", Sankhya, 7 (1946), 401 - 406. 

"Unbiased statistics with minimum variance", Proc. Roy. Soc. Edin., A, 63 (1950), 69 - 77. 

"The theory of regression in statistical population admitting local parameters", Bull. Int. Stat. Inst., 33, Part II (1951).

"On some uses of the t-distribution in multivariate analysis", Sankhya, 12 (1952), 89 - 104. 

"Notes on the use of unbiased and biased statistics in the binomial population", Cal. Stat. Assoc. Bull., 5 (1954), 149 - 164.

"Some uses of the 'amount of information' in the statistical inference", (address of the Sectional President), Proc. Ind. Sc. Cong., 46th Session (1959). 

"On a geometrical representation of probability distribution and its use in statistical inference", Cal. Stat. Assoc. Bull., 40 (1990–91), 23 - 49.

References

External links
Essays on probability and statistics: Festschrift in honour of Professor Anil Kumar Bhattacharyya

Anil Kumar Bhattacharyya (1915-1996): A Reverent Remembrance by Pranab K. Sen

Bengali scientists
Academic staff of the Indian Statistical Institute
Indian statisticians
1915 births
1996 deaths
People from Bhatpara
University of Calcutta alumni
Academic staff of the University of Calcutta
20th-century Indian mathematicians
Scientists from West Bengal